Senescence-associated beta-galactosidase (SA-β-gal or SABG) is a hypothetical hydrolase enzyme that catalyzes the hydrolysis of β-galactosides into monosaccharides only in senescent cells. Senescence-associated beta-galactosidase, along with p16Ink4A, is regarded to be a biomarker of cellular senescence.

Its existence was proposed in 1995 by Dimri et al. following the observation that when beta-galactosidase assays were carried out at pH 6.0, only cells in senescence state develop staining. They proposed a cytochemical assay based on production of a blue-dyed precipitate that results from the cleavage of the chromogenic substrate X-Gal, which stains blue when cleaved by galactosidase. Since then, even more specific quantitative assays were developed for its detection at pH 6.0.

Today this phenomenon is explained by the overexpression and accumulation of the endogenous lysosomal beta-galactosidase specifically in senescent cells. Its expression is not required for senescence. However, it remains as the most widely used biomarker for senescent and aging cells, because it is easy to detect and reliable both in situ and in vitro.

References

Further reading 

 

Biogerontology
Senescence
Aging-related enzymes
Hydrolases

ar:هرم (فيزيولوجيا)
ko:노화
ja:老化
pt:SA-beta-gal
qu:Machuyay
vi:Lão hoá
zh:衰老